Darker Days may refer to:

Darker Days (The Connells album), or the title song
Darker Days (Time Again album), or the title song
Darker Days (Stream of Passion album), or the title song
Darker Days (Peter Bjorn and John album)
Darker Days Radio (Horror Gaming Podcast)
Darker Days (Band)